Thomas, Tom or Tommy Cunningham may refer to:
Thomas Cunningham (Wisconsin politician) (1852–1941), Wisconsin Secretary of State, 1891–1895
Thomas Cunningham (Canadian politician) (1837–1916), merchant, horticulturist, and politician in British Columbia, Canada
Thomas Mounsey Cunningham (1776–1834), Scottish poet
Tom Cunningham (Australian footballer) (1901–1964), former Australian rules footballer
Tom Cunningham (hurler) (born 1931), Irish hurling player
Tommy Cunningham (footballer) (born 1955), English former footballer
Tommy Cunningham (rugby league) (born 1956), Welsh rugby league player
Tommy Cunningham (born 1964), Scottish drummer with Wet Wet Wet
Tom Cunningham, fictional character in Hollyoaks
Tom Cunningham (jockey) (born 1822)

See also 
Thomas Cunningham Cochran (1877–1957), American politician
Thomas Cunningham Gillespie (1892–1914), British rower
Tuff-E-Nuff (tugboat), known as Thomas Cunningham Sr., a late 19th-century tugboat